Oxygaster is a genus of cyprinid fishes found in Southeast Asia.  There are currently two described species in this genus.

Species
 Oxygaster anomalura van Hasselt, 1823
 Oxygaster pointoni (Fowler, 1934)

References
 

Cyprinid fish of Asia
Cyprinidae genera
Taxa named by Johan Conrad van Hasselt